Watcher is a type of biblical angel. The word occurs in both plural and singular forms in the Book of Daniel (4th–2nd century BC), where reference is made to the holiness of the beings. The apocryphal Books of Enoch (2nd–1st centuries BC) refer to both good and bad Watchers, with a primary focus on the rebellious ones.

Good watchers in Daniel  
In the Book of Daniel 4:13, 17, 23 (ESV) there are three references to the class of "watcher, holy one" (watcher, Aramaic '; holy one, Aramaic ). The term is introduced by Nebuchadnezzar who says he saw "a watcher, a holy one come down (singular verb) from heaven." He describes how in his dream the watcher says that Nebuchadnezzar will eat grass and be mad and that this punishment is "by the decree of the watchers, the demand by the word of the holy ones" ... "the living may know that the Most High rules in the kingdom of men." After hearing the king's dream, Daniel considers for an hour and then responds:

Lutheran Protestant reformer Johann Wigand viewed the watcher in Nebuchadnezzar's dream as either God himself, or the Son of God. He promoted Trinitarian thinking by linking verse 17 ("This matter is by the decree of the watchers") with verse 24 ("this is the decree of the most High").

Scholars view these "watchers, holy ones" as perhaps showing an influence of Babylonian religion, that is an attempt by the author of this section of Daniel to present Nebuchadnezzar's Babylonian gods recognizing the power of the god of Israel as "Most High". The Greek Septuagint version differs from the Aramaic Masoretic Text: for example, the Aramaic text is ambiguous about who is telling the story of verse 14, whether it is Nebuchadnezzar, or the watcher in his dream.

Books of Enoch 
In the Books of Enoch, the first Book of Enoch devotes much of its attention to the fall of the watchers. The Second Book of Enoch addresses the watchers (Gk. egrḗgoroi) who are in fifth heaven where the fall took place. The Third Book of Enoch gives attention to the unfallen watchers.

The use of the term "watchers" is common in the Book of Enoch. The Book of the Watchers (1 Enoch 6–36) occurs in the Aramaic fragments with the phrase irin we-qadishin, "Watchers and Holy Ones", a reference to Aramaic Daniel. The Aramaic irin "watchers" is rendered as "angel" (Greek angelos, Coptic malah) in the Greek and Ethiopian translations, although the usual Aramaic term for angel malakha does not occur in Aramaic Enoch.

Some have attempted to date this section of 1 Enoch to around the 2nd–1st century BC and they believe this book is based on one interpretation of the Sons of God passage in Genesis 6, according to which angels mated with human females, giving rise to a race of hybrids known as the Nephilim. The term irin is primarily applied to disobedient watchers who numbered a total of 200, and of whom their leaders are named; but equally Aramaic iri ("watcher" singular) is also applied to the obedient archangels who chain them, such as Raphael (1 Enoch 22:6).

Bad watchers in the Book of Enoch 

In the Book of Enoch, the watchers (Aramaic עִירִין, iyrin) are angels dispatched to Earth to watch over the humans. They soon begin to lust for human women and, at the prodding of their leader Samyaza, defect en masse to illicitly instruct humanity and procreate among them. The offspring of these unions are the Nephilim, savage giants who pillage the earth and endanger humanity.

Samyaza and his associates further taught their human charges arts and technologies such as weaponry, cosmetics, mirrors, sorcery, and other techniques that would otherwise be discovered gradually over time by humans, not foisted upon them all at once. Eventually God allows a Great Flood to rid the earth of the Nephilim, but first sends Uriel to warn Noah so as not to eradicate the human race. The watchers are bound "in the valleys of the Earth" until Judgment Day (Jude verse 6 says, "And the angels which kept not their first estate, but left their own habitation, he hath reserved in everlasting chains under darkness unto the judgment of the great day.").

The chiefs of tens, listed in the Book of Enoch, are as follows:

The book of Enoch also lists leaders of the 200 fallen angels who married and commenced in unnatural union with human women, and who taught forbidden knowledge. Some are also listed in Book of Raziel (Sefer Raziel HaMalakh), the Zohar, and Jubilees.

 Araqiel (also Arakiel, Araqael, Araciel, Arqael, Sarquael, Arkiel, Arkas) taught humans the signs of the earth. However, in the Sibylline Oracles, Araqiel is referred to not as a fallen angel, or watcher, but as one of the five angels who lead the souls of humans to judgment, the other four being Ramiel, Uriel, Samael, and Azazel.
 Armaros (also Amaros or Armoniel) in Enoch I taught humanity the resolving of enchantments.
 Azazel taught humans to make knives, swords, shields, and how to devise ornaments and cosmetics.
 Gadreel (or Gader'el) taught the art of cosmetics, the use of weapons and killing blows.
 Baraqel (Baraqiel) taught astrology.
 Bezaliel mentioned in Enoch I, left out of most translations because of damaged manuscripts and problematic transmission of the text.
 Chazaqiel (sometimes Ezeqeel or Cambriel) taught humans the signs of the clouds (meteorology).
 Kokabiel (also Kakabel, Kochbiel, Kokbiel, Kabaiel, and Kochab), In the Book of Raziel he is a high-ranking, holy angel. In Enoch I, he is a fallen watcher, resident of the nether realms, and commands 365,000 surrogate spirits to do his bidding. Among other duties, he instructs his fellows in astrology.
 Penemue "taught mankind the art of writing with ink and paper," and taught "the children of men the bitter and the sweet and the secrets of wisdom." (I Enoch 69.8)
 Sariel (also Suriel) taught humankind about the courses of the moon (at one time regarded as forbidden knowledge).
 Samyaza (also Shemyazaz, Shamazya, Semiaza, Shemhazi, Semyaza and Amezyarak) is one of the leaders of the fall from heaven in Vocabulaire de l' Angelologie.
 Shamsiel, once a guardian of Eden as stated in the Zohar, served as one of the two chief aides to the archangel Uriel (the other aide being Hasdiel) when Uriel bore his standard into battle, and is the head of 365 legions of angels and also crowns prayers, accompanying them to the 5th heaven. In Jubilees, he is referred to as one of the Watchers. He is a fallen angel who teaches the signs of the sun.
 Yeqon or Jeqon was the ringleader who first tempted the other Watchers into having sexual relations with humans. His accomplices were Asbeel, Gadreel, Penemue, and Kasdaye (or Kasadya), who were all identified as individual "satans".

The account of the Book of Enoch has been associated with the passage in Genesis 6:1-4, which speaks of Sons of God instead of Watchers:

Second Book of Enoch 

The Jewish pseudepigraphon Second Book of Enoch (Slavonic Enoch) refers to the Grigori, who are the same as the Watchers of 1 Enoch. The Slavic word Grigori used in the book is a transcription of the Greek word ἐγρήγοροι egrḗgoroi, meaning "wakeful". The Hebrew equivalent is ערים, meaning "waking", "awake".

Chapter 18 presents the Grigori as countless soldiers of human appearance, "their size being greater than that of great giants". They are located in the fifth heaven and identified as "the Grigori, who with their prince Satanail rejected the Lord of light". One version of 2 Enoch adds that their number was 200 myriads (2 million). Furthermore, some "went down on to earth from the Lord's throne" and there married women and "befouled the earth with their deeds", resulting in confinement underground. The number of those who descended to earth is generally put at three, but Andrei A. Orlov, while quoting the text as saying three, remarks in a footnote that some manuscripts put them at 200 or even 200 myriads.

Chapter 29, referring to the second day of creation, before the creation of human beings, says that "one from out the order of angels" or, according to other versions of 2 Enoch, "one of the order of archangels" or "one of the ranks of the archangels" "conceived an impossible thought, to place his throne higher than the clouds above the earth, that he might become equal in rank to [the Lord's] power. And [the Lord] threw him out from the height with his angels, and he was flying in the air continuously above the bottomless." Although in this chapter the name "Satanail" is mentioned only in a heading added in one manuscript, this chapter too is often understood to refer to Satanail and his angels, the Grigori.

The Mercer Dictionary of the Bible makes a distinction between the Grigori and the fallen angels by stating that in fifth heaven, Enoch sees "the giants whose brothers were the fallen angels."

The longer recension of 2 Enoch 18:3 identifies the prisoners of second heaven as the angels of Satanail.

Book of Giants 
The story of the Watchers is shown also in the Book of Giants.

Philo 
According to PrEv 1.10.1-2 of Philo of Byblos, Sanchuniathon mentioned "some living beings who had no perception, out of whom intelligent beings came into existence, and they were called Zophasemin (Heb. șōpē-šāmayim, that is, 'Watchers of Heaven'). And they were formed like the shape of an egg."

Jubilees 
The term "Watchers" occurs in the Book of Jubilees (Jub. 4:15, 5:1).

Damascus Document 
A reference to the "fall of the watchers from heaven" is found in Hebrew in the Damascus Document 2:18 echoing 1 Enoch 13:10.

Kabbalah 
The Zohar makes reference to the "watchers" of Nebuchadnezzar's dream.

Possible Babylonian/Aramaic origin 
According to Jonathan Ben-Dov of the University of Haifa, the myth of the watchers began in Lebanon when Aramaic writers tried to interpret the imagery on Mesopotamian stone monuments without being able to read their Akkadian text.

Amar Annus from the University of Tartu argues that the Watchers were intended as polemical representations of the Mesopotamian Apkallu, who gave wisdom to man before the flood (which is portrayed as a corrupting influence in Enochian literature).

Depictions in popular culture 
There have been many different depictions of the Grigori in fiction and wider popular culture.

In Kevin Smith's 1999 religious satire Dogma, the character Bartleby (played by Ben Affleck) is mentioned to have formerly been a Watcher.

In Darren Aronofsky's 2014 Biblical epic Noah, there are a large number of Watchers and they are depicted as having been cast out of Heaven after deciding to help mankind.

In Traci Harding's book The Cosmic Logos the Grigori are a group of fallen spiritual beings who watched over and assisted human spiritual evolution thus gaining the title "the Watchers".

In the Supernatural season 10 episode "Angel Heart" mentions the Grigori with one, Tamiel (under the name "Peter Holloway") appearing as the main enemy of the episode. At one point in this episode, a picture is shown that is implied to be a painting of a grigori—it is, in fact, a classic depiction of the archangel Michael besting Satan.

In the popular The Black Tapes podcast, Grigori are mentioned in Episode 105 titled "The Devil You Know".

In his Sigma Force novel The Bone Labyrinth (2015), James Rollins describes Atlantis' creators as Watchers, a superior hybrid species of early humans and neanderthals who disseminated knowledge and possibly interbred with people throughout the world. They also created the protected, hidden city of Atlantis, located in Ecuador.

In Lauren Kate's book Fallen a group called 'The Watchers' studied angels who consorted with mortal women, but more closely, Daniel Grigori the sixth archangel.

In Darynda Jones' "Charley Davidson" series, Sean Foster is identified as nephilim, "part human, part angel ... descended from the union of a grigori and a human." (Eleventh Grave in Moonlight, 2017)

In Ichiei Ishibumi's Japanese light novel series, High School DxD, the Grigori is an organisation of fallen angels, the leaders of which are some of the Watchers named in the Book of Enoch. Three of them play important roles in the story Azazel is the Governor General of Grigori and becomes a major supporting character, Kokabiel is the main antagonist of Volume 3 and Baraqiel is the estranged father of Akeno Himejima, one of the main characters.

In El Shaddai: Ascension of the Metatron, many members of the Grigori are shown throughout the game as the main antagonists. To name a few: Azazel, Armaros, Arakiel, Baraqiel, and Semyaza.

In the English localization of Drakengard, the overarching antagonists are semi-divine beings called "the Watchers." Though the game sometimes refers to them as "daemons," in the original Japanese text they are simply called angels. The English localization for the prequel, Drakengard 3, calls them angels as well.

In the original Dragon’s Dogma, the dragon is attributed the name Grigori by a separate antagonist. The dragon never refers to itself as such.

See also
 List of angels in theology

Notes

References

General references 
 
 
 
 
 
 
 
 
 
 
 

 
Angels in Judaism
Book of Daniel
Book of Enoch
Classes of angels
Hebrew Bible words and phrases
Primordial teachers
Book of Jubilees